Toronto City Mission (TCM) is a Christian nonprofit organization that is the oldest and longest running outreach to people living in poverty in Toronto, Ontario, Canada. The organization's headquarters is located in Scarborough, a suburb of Toronto.

History

Toronto City Mission was established on November 14, 1879, by a group of ministers and laymen to improve the spiritual and material welfare of the poor throughout the Toronto area. The focus was on assisting needy parents, children, widows, the elderly, the sick, hungry and deserted, the unemployed, and on preaching the Christian gospel.

In 1894, the mission took over the work of the Fred Victor Mission.

In 1894, the mission purchased a home in what was then Bronte, which was used as a country camp for families and children from Toronto until 1977; the mission provided food, clothing, Christian evangelism, and a break from the city heat.

In 1898, a group of three women doctors founded a dispensary for poor women at the mission's Sackville Street location. This later grew to become Women's College Hospital.

Current activities 
In 1999, the Toronto City Mission changed its focus from being a provider of shelter, food, and clothing resources to a provider of self and community improvement opportunities. The mission organized a number of programs based on Christian values and beliefs; the programs are open to people from all religions, race, and sexual orientations.

About 180 children from grades one to six attend after-school programming and tutoring programs. Youth who are in Junior High and Senior High are offered after-school programming, tutoring, and mentorship. A youth leadership program called TLC (Teens Leading Community) allows youth to give back to their communities by being volunteers and leaders of the children's programs.

In conjunction with the Sprott Foundation, the mission provides the Role Model Moms Program in the Jane-Finch Community, with the goal of helping young mothers to pass the high school equivalency exam regulated by the government of Ontario. There is also a men's basketball program in St. James Town.

Toronto City Mission organizes community gatherings in the various neighborhoods, including bi-monthly pot-luck dinners, family celebrations, Christmas celebrations with turkey dinners and gifts, and Adopt-a-Family, a program which matches families with sponsors and provides them with grocery and department store gift certificates during Christmas.

During the summer and March break, the mission runs five-day "Sonshine" camps for kids from low-income families in partnership with area churches – Malvern Methodist, Bridletowne Park, St. Paul's Bloor St. Anglican, Wellspring Worship Centre, Willowdale Baptist Church, Spring Garden Baptist, and Emmanuel Church of the Nazarene Chinese Gospel Scarborough. A weeklong family camp is also offered for families impacted by living in poverty. These camps are sponsored by the Toronto Star Fresh Air Fund that sends thousands of kids to camp every year.  About 170 campers attend the camps each week.

References

External links
Toronto City Mission

1879 establishments in Canada
Non-profit organizations based in Toronto
Scarborough, Toronto
Organizations established in 1879